Moushaumi Robinson (born April 13, 1981 in Hattiesburg, Mississippi) is an American track and field athlete.  She represented the United States at the 2004 Summer Olympics in Athens, where she won a gold medal in the 4×400 metres relay for her contributions in the preliminary round.

References

External links

 
 

Living people
1981 births
American female sprinters
Athletes (track and field) at the 2003 Pan American Games
Athletes (track and field) at the 2004 Summer Olympics
Olympic gold medalists for the United States in track and field
Sportspeople from Hattiesburg, Mississippi
Track and field athletes from Mississippi
African-American female track and field athletes
Medalists at the 2004 Summer Olympics
Pan American Games gold medalists for the United States
Pan American Games medalists in athletics (track and field)
World Athletics Indoor Championships medalists
Medalists at the 2003 Pan American Games
Olympic female sprinters
21st-century African-American sportspeople
21st-century African-American women
20th-century African-American people
20th-century African-American women